The Israel Aircraft Industries Kfir ("Lion Cub") is an Israeli all-weather multirole combat aircraft based on the French Dassault Mirage 5, with Israeli avionics and an Israeli-built version of the General Electric J79 turbojet engine.

Development

Background

The project that would ultimately give birth to the Kfir can be traced back to Israel's need for adapting the Dassault Mirage IIIC to the specific requirements of the Israeli Air Force (IAF).

The all-weather, delta-winged Mirage IIICJ was the first Mach 2 aircraft acquired by Israel from then-close ally France, and constituted the backbone of the IAF during most of the 1960s, until the arrival of the Douglas A-4 Skyhawk and, most importantly, the McDonnell Douglas F-4 Phantom II, by the end of the decade. While the Mirage IIICJ proved to be extremely effective in the air-superiority role, its relatively short range imposed some limitations on its usefulness as a ground-attack aircraft.

Thus, in the mid-1960s, at the request of Israel, Dassault Aviation began developing the Mirage 5, a fair-weather, ground-attack version of the Mirage III. Following the suggestions made by the Israelis, advanced avionics located behind the cockpit were removed, allowing the aircraft to increase its fuel-carrying capacity while reducing maintenance costs.

By 1968, Dassault had finished production of the 50 Mirage 5Js paid for by Israel, but an arms embargo imposed upon Israel by the French government in 1967 prevented deliveries from taking place. The Israelis replied by producing an unlicensed copy of the Mirage 5, the Nesher, with technical specifications for both the airframe and the engine obtained by Israeli spies.

Design

The Kfir programme originated in the quest to develop a more capable version of the IAI Nesher, which was already in series production. After General De Gaulle embargoed the sale of arms to Israel, the IAF feared that it might lose qualitative superiority over its adversaries in the future, which were receiving increasingly advanced Soviet aircraft. The main and most advanced type of aircraft available to the IAF was the Mirage, but a severe problem developed due to the Mirage fleet's depletion due to attrition after the Six-Day War. Domestic production would avoid the problem of the embargo completely; efforts to reverse engineer and reproduce components of the Mirage were aided by Israeli espionage efforts to obtain technical assistance and blueprints from third party Mirage operators.

Two powerplants were initially selected for trials, the General Electric J79 turbojet and the Rolls-Royce Spey turbofan. In the end, the J79 was selected, not least because it was the same engine used on the McDonnell Douglas F-4 Phantom II, which the Israelis began to acquire from the United States in 1969, along with a license to produce the J79 themselves. The J79 was clearly superior to the original French Atar 09, providing a dry thrust of 49 kN (11,000 lbf) and an afterburning thrust of 83.4 kN (18,750 lbf).

In order to accommodate the new powerplant on the Mirage III's airframe, and to deliver the added cooling required by the J79, the aircraft's rear fuselage was slightly shortened and widened, its air intakes were enlarged, and a large air inlet was installed at the base of the vertical stabilizer, so as to supply the extra cooling needed for the afterburner. The engine itself was encased in a titanium heatshield.

A two-seat Mirage IIIBJ fitted with the GE J79 made its first flight in September 1970, and was soon followed by a re-engined Nesher, which flew in September 1971.

An improved prototype of the aircraft, with the name Ra'am B ("Ra'am" means "Thunder"; the "Ra'am A" was the Nesher), made its first flight in June 1973. It had an extensively revised cockpit, a strengthened landing gear, and a considerable amount of Israeli-built avionics.

There were unconfirmed reports that a number of the original Mirage IIICs, re-engined with the J79 and given the name Barak ("Lightning"), took part in the Yom Kippur War of 1973, but some sources point out that there is no evidence that these aircraft ever existed.

Operational history

Israel

The Kfir entered service with the IAF in 1975, the first units being assigned to the 101st "First Fighter" Squadron. Over the following years, several other squadrons were also equipped with the new aircraft. The role of the Kfir as the IAF's primary air superiority asset was short-lived, as the first F-15 Eagle fighters from the United States were delivered to Israel in 1976.

The Kfir's first recorded combat action took place on November 9, 1977, during an Israeli air strike on a training camp at Tel Azia, in Lebanon. The only air victory claimed by a Kfir during its service with the IAF occurred on June 27, 1979 when a Kfir C.2 shot down a Syrian MiG-21.

By the time of the Israeli invasion of southern Lebanon in 1982 (Operation Peace for Galilee) the IAF was able to use both its F-15s and F-16s for air superiority roles, leaving the Kfirs to carry out unescorted strike missions. Shortly afterwards, all IAF C.2s began to be upgraded to the C.7 version, with enhanced weight performance, making the Kfir more suitable to its new fighter-bomber role. During the second half of the 1990s, the Kfirs were withdrawn from active duty in the IAF, after almost twenty years of continuous service.

Israel Aerospace Industries announced in August 2013 it will offer pre-owned Kfir fighter jets to foreign customers, with a 40-year guarantee. Unit price is reported to be $20 million. A few Eastern European and Latin American countries have expressed interest, Israel's Globes business daily reported. By October 2013, Israel Aerospace Industries was in "very advanced negotiations" with at least two air forces interested in the Kfir Block 60.  An aircraft can be delivered within one year, with two squadrons to be sold in two to three years.  The Block 60 is offered with the Elta EL/M-2032 with open architecture avionics to allow a customer to install other systems.  The sensor provides an all-aspect, look-down/shoot-down performance in air-to-air and air-to-ground missions, with the capability to simultaneously track up to 64 targets. The J79 has been overhauled to zero flight hours, and would need replacement after 1,600 hours.

Foreign service
Since the J79 turbojet engine is an U.S. design, although manufactured under license in Israel, all export sales of the Kfir are subject to prior approval being granted by the U.S. State Department, a fact that has limited the sale of the Kfir to foreign nations.

As of 2006, the IAI Kfir has been exported to Colombia, Ecuador, and Sri Lanka.

Colombia

As a result of a trade agreement between Colombia and Israel in 1989 the Colombian government bought a batch of 12 ex-IAF Kfir C.2s and one TC.2, which were delivered to the Colombian Air Force (FAC) in 1989–1990. Since then, all the C.2s have been upgraded to the C.7 variant. The FAC Kfirs have been widely used in ground-attack missions during counter-insurgency operations against Colombian terrorists. As of 2004 two aircraft had been lost in accidents.

In February 2008, Colombia signed a deal with the Israeli government for an additional 24 ex-IAF Kfir aircraft. It was estimated that these aircraft will most probably be upgraded by Israel Aerospace Industries (IAI) to C.10 standard.

In June 2009, IAI delivered the first batch of upgraded Kfirs to the Colombian Air Force in a ceremony held at IAI's facilities in Israel. In attendance at the ceremony was Juan Hurtado Cano, the Colombian Ambassador to Israel, high-ranking officers from the Colombian Air Force, and executives from the  International Defense Cooperation Directorate of the Israeli Ministry of Defense (IMOD-SIBAT). This was a part of a multi-year contract awarded in late 2007 and worth over $150 million to upgrade the existing Colombian Air Force Kfirs, and to supply additional jets. The additional Kfir jets, models C.10-C.12, have been upgraded and improved to include IAI's latest technologies and products.

On July 20, 2009, a Kfir crashed near the city of Cartagena. The Israeli pilots operating the plane were unharmed in the incident, but the jet itself was destroyed. Israel Aerospace Industries said in a statement that the plane was flying a refresher flight, and that the aircraft didn't come to a stop on the landing strip, landing outside it. The director of the Israel Aerospace Industries announced that an investigation into the incident had already begun and that a panel to probe the crash had been appointed. On July 22, 2009, IAI informed the Colombian Air Force that the accident was caused by an unspecified human error. As a result, IAI will replace the unit lost with another one and it will resume delivery to the Colombian Air Force.

On November 1, 2013, two Colombian Air Force IAI Kfirs intercepted Russian Air Force Tu-160s that had entered Colombian airspace. The Russian aircraft had taken off from Simón Bolívar International Airport Venezuela.

On October 10, 2017, Colombian IAI Kfirs were updated with the EL/M 2052 AESA Radar and incorporated the I-Derby-ER Active Air to Air Missile and the Python-5 Air to Air Infrared Missile

As of 2019, 23 Colombian IAI Kfirs remain in service.

Ecuador

In 1981, Ecuador and Israel signed a sales agreement for ten refurbished and new ex-IAF Kfir C.2s and two TC.2s, which were delivered to the Ecuadorian Air Force (FAE) in 1982–1983. The Kfirs formed the 2113rd Squadron (Lions) of the FAE's 21st Fighter Wing, based at Taura AFB, on the Ecuadorian western lowlands.

The FAE Kfirs went into action during the 1995 Cenepa War between Ecuador and Peru. Relying on its fleet of subsonic A-37Bs for low-level ground-attack missions on Peruvian positions, the Ecuadorian Air Force held back its Mirage F.1s and Kfir C.2s for use as escorts and interceptors. On February 10, 1995, a Kfir C.2 shot down a Peruvian Air Force Cessna A-37B with a Shafrir 2 IR-homing AAM.

In 1996, with tensions still running high between Ecuador and Peru, the Ecuadorians acquired four additional Kfirs (three C.2 and one TC.2) after securing approval from the U.S. State Department.

In 1998, with its aging squadron of SEPECAT Jaguar fighter-bombers about to be withdrawn from active duty, Ecuador began talks with Israel for the sale of a new batch of eight Kfirs. Fearing an escalation of the arms race in South America (Peru had recently acquired 18 MiG-29s and 18 Su-25s from Belarus), the United States blocked the deal. As an alternative, Ecuador and Israel signed an agreement in 1999 for the delivery of two Kfir C.10s and for the conversion of an undisclosed number of the FAE's original C.2s to the C.10 version, referred to in Ecuador as Kfir CE, featuring a Helmet Mounted Display System, and armed with Python 3 and Python 4 IR-homing AAMs.

By 2005, Ecuador had lost four Kfirs, including one TC.2, due to accidents since the aircraft entered service in 1982.

Sri Lanka

The Sri Lanka Air Force (SLAF) acquired six Kfir C.2s and a single TC.2 in 1995–1996. A further nine aircraft had been added to the inventory by 2005, including four C.2s and four C.7s acquired in 2000. Currently the SLAF operates two TC.2s, two C.7s and six C.2s by the No. 10 "Fighter" Squadron. The SLAF used their Kfirs to carry out attacks against LTTE rebels during the Sri Lankan Civil War in Sri Lanka. Two Kfir C.7s were destroyed on the ground in an LTTE attack on SLAF Katunayake air base, part of Bandaranaike International Airport, on 24 July 2001. Three others were lost in non-combat related accidents during the Civil War period. None were lost in aerial combat. In March 2011, two Kfirs collided in mid-air during an airshow practice sortie.

On June 30, 2021, it was announced that the IAI will upgrade five Sri Lankan Kfirs for a return to service with new systems and sensors under a US$50 million contract.

United States

Between 1985 and 1989, the United States Navy and United States Marine Corps leased 25 examples of the Kfir C.1, which were officially designated F-21A and modified for use as unarmed adversaries: mock opponents in dissimilar air combat training (DACT). These aircraft had narrow-span canard foreplanes and two small rectangular strakes, one on either side of the nose, which considerably improved the aircraft's maneuverability and handling at low speeds.

The 12 F-21 aircraft leased to the U.S. Navy, painted in a three-tone blue-gray "ghost" scheme, were operated by Fighter Squadron 43 (VF-43), based at NAS Oceana, Virginia. In 1988, they were returned and replaced by the F-16N. The 13 aircraft leased to the U.S. Marine Corps were operated by Marine Fighter Training Squadron 401 (VMFT-401), a 4th Marine Aircraft Wing/ Marine Corps Reserve squadron at Marine Corps Air Station Yuma, Arizona. In addition to the blue-gray painted aircraft, the USMC also had some F-21s painted in Israeli colors and desert "flogger" schemes (named because they were to represent the schemes often worn by Warsaw Pact MiG-23 "Floggers"). The Kfir was utilized because they both shared the common characteristic of being very fast (Mach 2+) and fast-accelerating aircraft with relatively poor maneuverability. The MiG-23 was targeted as the "enemy" aircraft because at this time the MiG-23 was being introduced in very large numbers, and was a very capable aircraft compared to earlier Soviet types. These USMC F-21 aircraft were replaced by F-5E aircraft when the F-21s were returned in 1989 (although this left the training units without any aircraft capable of accurately simulating the Mach 2+ and fast-accelerating MiG-23).

Six Kfirs are also used by the US firm Airborne Tactical Advantage Company (ATAC), a civilian defense contractor that provides tactical adversary aircraft services to the US military. ATAC provides airborne tactical training, threat simulation, and research & development. ATAC's corporate headquarters and primary operating location is at Patrick Henry International Airport in Newport News, VA, with additional permanent operating locations at US Naval Air Stations and Marine Corps Air Stations in California, Nevada, Hawaii and Japan.  ATAC also operates Hawker Hunter F.58s. On March 6, 2012, an ATAC Kfir, FAA registration N404AX, crashed while landing at NAS Fallon, Nevada after a flight supporting the Naval Strike and Air Warfare Center. The pilot, retired USN Captain Carroll "Lex" LeFon, was fatally injured.

Potential users

In the early 1990s, IAI was looking to export 40 Kfir-C fighters to the Republic of China (Taiwan) in a deal estimated to have been worth US$400 million to $1 billion; however, the deal ultimately fell through.

During 2013, the Argentine Air Force commenced negotiations with Israel for 18 Kfir Block 60 fighters as an alternative to another deal for 16 ex-Spanish Mirage F1 fighters. During mid-2014, industry sources claim IAI will "soon" receive an order from the Argentine Air Force for Kfir Block 60s after their purchase of surplus Spanish Mirage F1s failed.

Variants
 Kfir C.1: Basic production variant.
 F-21A Kfir: 25 upgraded Kfir C.1 aircraft were leased to the USN and USMC for an aggressor role and were designated F-21A Lion. These aircraft had been modified and included canards on the air intakes. These canards greatly improved the aircraft maneuverability and slow speed control, and were adopted on later variants.
 Kfir C.2: An improved C.1 that featured many aerodynamic improvements. Changes included "dogtoothed" leading edges on the wings, small strakes under the nose and a larger sweep angle of the canards.
 Kfir TC.2: A two-seat training variant developed from the C.2. It has a longer and lowered nose to improve the pilot's view.
 Kfir RC.2: Reconnaissance version of the C.2 commonly known as the Kfir Tzniut due to the Tzniut camera nose being fitted to it.
 Kfir C.7: Vastly modified variant. Most if not all C.2 aircraft were modified to this variant. It included an improved J79-GE-J1E engine that provided an additional  of thrust at full afterburner (and as a result increasing the Maximum Take-off Weight by ), 2 more hardpoints  under the air intakes, better avionics such as a MFD, HOTAS configured cockpit.
 Kfir TC.7: A two-seat training variant developed from the C.7.
 Kfir C.9: Proposal for Argentina powered by Atar 9K50. Cancelled. Later developed as South Africa's Atlas Cheetah
 Kfir C.10: A variant developed especially for export. The most important change is the adaptation of the Elta EL/M-2032 radar. Other changes include HMD capability and two 127×177mm MFDs. This variant is also known as Kfir CE ( Ecuadorean version ) and Kfir COA (Colombian version).
 Kfir TC.10: Upgraded version of the TC.7 for the Colombian Air Force.
 Kfir C.12: Upgraded version of the C.7 for the Colombian Air Force, a C.10 without the Elta EL/M-2032 radar.
 Kfir Block 60: Upgraded version of the C.10, The main feature of this variant is the use of AESA radar, proposed to the Bulgarian Air Force and Colombian Air Force.  Argentina is reported to be interested in a US$500m deal for eighteen Block 60 to replace its planned acquisition of second-hand Mirage F1M from Spain.
 Kfir NG: Upgraded version, short for Next-Generation. Offered to current and former operators Colombia, Ecuador and Sri Lanka, revealed at Paris Air Show 2019.

Operators

Current

 Colombian Air Force : 23 in service as 2019.
 111 Combat Squadron

 Sri Lanka Air Force
 No. 10 Squadron

 Textron subsidiary Airborne Tactical Advantage Company operates 6 IAI F-21 Kfirs

Former

 Ecuadorian Air Force

  Israeli Air Force
 101 Squadron
 109 Squadron
 113 Squadron
 144 Squadron
 149 Squadron
 254 Squadron

 United States Navy
 United States Marine Corps 
Under the tri-service designation F-21A Lion, the type was used as an adversary fighter by the Strike Fighter Tactics Instructor program (a.k.a. TOPGUN), run under the auspices of the US Navy. Training of Navy and Marine Corps aviators ceased in 1988 and 1989 respectively.

Aircraft on display

Israel
010 - Kfir C.2 displayed as a gate guardian at Ovda Airport.
310 - Kfir TC.2 on display at the Israeli Air Force Museum in Hatzerim Airbase.
419 - Kfir RC.2 Tzniut on display at the Israeli Air Force Museum in Hatzerim Airbase.
451 - Kfir RC.2 Tzniut on display at the Israeli Air Force Museum in Hatzerim Airbase.
514 - Kfir C.7 on display at the Israeli Air Force Museum in Hatzerim Airbase.
529 - Kfir C.7 on display at the Israeli Air Force Museum in Hatzerim Airbase.
664 - Kfir C.2 mounted on a pylon in Beersheba.
712 - Kfir C.1 on display at the Israeli Air Force Museum in Hatzerim Airbase.
742 - Kfir C.1 on display at Madatech in Haifa.
814 - Kfir C.2 on display at Ramat David Airbase.
826 - Kfir C.2 on display at the Israeli Air Force Museum in Hatzerim Airbase.
853 - Kfir C.2 on display at the Israeli Air Force Museum in Hatzerim Airbase.
869 - Kfir C.2 on display at Hatzor Airbase.
874 - Kfir C.2 on display at the Israeli Air Force Museum in Hatzerim Airbase.
875 - Kfir C.2 preserved in the Givat Olga neighborhood of Hadera.
886 - Kfir C.2 on display at the Israeli Air Force Museum in Hatzerim Airbase.
895 - Kfir C.2 on display at the Israeli Air Force Museum in Hatzerim Airbase.
988 - Kfir TC.2 on display at the Israeli Air Force Museum in Hatzerim Airbase. 
BuNo 999725 - F-21A Kfir on display at the Israeli Air Force Museum in Hatzerim Airbase.
BuNo 999764 - F-21A Kfir on display at the Israeli Air Force Museum in Hatzerim Airbase.

Sri Lanka
CF-712 - Kfir C.2 mounted on a pylon at the Sri Lanka Air Force Museum.
SFM-721 - Kfir C.7 on display at the Sri Lanka Air Force Museum.
SFM-5207 - Kfir C.2 displayed outside of SLAF Colombo in Colombo.

United States
BuNo 999734 - F-21A Kfir on display at the Intrepid Sea, Air & Space Museum.

Specifications (Kfir C2)

See also

References

Bibliography
 Niccoli, Riccardo. David's Deltas: Israel's Mirage, Nesher and Kfir Family, Part 3. Air Enthusiast 105, May/June 2003, pp. 68–73. 
Taylor, John W. R. Jane's All The World's Aircraft 1982–83. London:Jane's Yearbooks, 1982. .

Further reading 
 Maquinas de Guerra – Enciclopedia de las Armas del Siglo XX. Planeta-De Agostini, Madrid, 1984. (Aerospace Publishing Ltd., London, 1983). .
 Terry Gander, Christopher Chant, Bob Munro, Collins/Jane's Combat Aircraft. Harper Resource, 1995. .
 Federation of American Scientists, www.fas.org.
 Air Combat Information Group, www.acig.org.
 Greg Goebel, www.vectorsite.net.
 Mirage. James Follett. Novel describing the clandestine operation by an Israeli civilian to steal the engineering drawings of the Mirage from a Swiss sub-contractor in the late 1960s.

External links

 Israel Aircraft Industries F-21A Kfir
 Walkaround IAI Kfir C.1, I.A.F. Museum, Israel
 Walkaround IAI F-21A Kfir, I.A.F. Museum, Israel
 Walkaround IAI Kfir C.2, I.A.F. Museum, Israel
 Walkaround  IAI Kfir C.2, I.A.F. Museum, Israel
 Walkaround IAI Kfir TC.2, I.A.F. Museum, Israel

Canard aircraft
Tailless delta-wing aircraft
IAI aircraft
1970s Israeli fighter aircraft
Single-engined jet aircraft
Aircraft first flown in 1973